Ron Clark (born 9 March 1930) is a British long-distance runner. He competed in the marathon at the 1956 Summer Olympics.

References

1930 births
Living people
People from Lambeth
Athletes from London
English male marathon runners
Olympic athletes of Great Britain
Athletes (track and field) at the 1956 Summer Olympics